Humphreys is a common surname. Notable people with the surname include:

Alan Humphreys (born 1939), English former professional footballer
Alastair Humphreys, English cyclist, adventurer, author and motivational speaker
Alf Humphreys (1953–2018), Canadian actor 
Andrew Humphreys (1821–1904), U.S. politician
Andrew A. Humphreys (1810–1883), U.S. Army officer and Union general
Anthony Humphreys (born 1971), Australian cricketer
Arthur Humphreys (1917–2003), British former managing director of International Computers Limited (ICL)
Ben Humphreys (1934–2019), Australian politician
Benjamin G. Humphreys (1808–1882), U.S. politician and Confederate Army general
Benjamin G. Humphreys II (1865–1923), U.S. politician
Billy Humphreys, English footballer
Bob Humphreys (disambiguation)
Cecil Humphreys (1883–1947), British film actor
Charles Humphreys (1714–1786), U.S. miller, Continental Congressman from Pennsylvania
Chris Humphreys, British novelist and actor
Christine Humphreys, Welsh politician
Christmas Humphreys (1901–1983), British High Court judge and founder of the London Buddhist Society
Colin Humphreys (born 1941), British physicist and author (Biblical studies)
Conrad Humphreys (born 1973), English professional sailor
Corinne Humphreys (born 1991), English sprinter
Curtis J. Humphreys (1898–1986), American physicist
David Humphreys (disambiguation)
Ed Humphreys (born 1953), Canadian retired professional ice hockey player
Edward Humphreys (disambiguation)
Eliza Humphreys (1850–1938), English novelist
Emyr Humphreys (1919–2020), Welsh novelist
Francis Humphreys (died 1961), Irish politician
Frederick Humphreys (disambiguation)
George Humphreys (cricketer) (1845–1894), English cricketer
George Humphreys (1863–1945), British civil engineer
George Humphreys (rugby union) (1870–1933), English-born New Zealand rugby union player
Gerry Humphreys (1931–2006), Welsh sound engineer
Gordon Noel Humphreys (1883–1966), British surveyor, pilot, botanist, explorer and doctor
Helen Humphreys (born 1961), Canadian author
Henry Noel Humphreys (1810–1879), a British illustrator, naturalist, entomologist, and numismatist
Humphrey Humphreys (1648–1712), Welsh bishop
Ian Humphreys (born 1982), Northern Irish rugby player
James Humphreys (disambiguation)
Jennett Humphreys (1829/30–1917), English author and poet
Jessica Dee Humphreys (born 1970), Canadian writer
Jere T. Humphreys (born 1949), American music scholar
Jimmy Humphreys (1894–1956), Irish hurler
John Humphreys (disambiguation)
Jonathan Humphreys (born 1969), Welsh rugby player
Josephine Humphreys (born 1945), U.S. novelist
Joshua Humphreys (1751–1838), U.S. ship builder
Kalita Humphreys (1915/1916 - 1954), American actress
Kathryn Humphreys (born 1970), Canadian sports commentator
Kevin Humphreys (disambiguation)
Kirk Humphreys (born 1950), U.S. politician
Laud Humphreys (1930–1988), U.S. sociologist
Lloyd Humphreys (1913–2003), U.S. psychologist
Margaret Humphreys (born 1944), English social worker, author and whistleblower
Neil Humphreys (born 1974), British humour columnist
Marika Humphreys (born 1977), British ice dancer
Michael Humphreys (MP) (died 1626), MP for Dorchester, England
Mike Humphreys (born 1967), American Major League Baseball player
Murray Humphreys (1899–1965), U.S. criminal
Sir Myles Humphreys (died 1998), Northern Irish politician and activist
Nigel Humphreys (born 1951), British actor
Noel Forbes Humphreys (1890–1918), Welsh rugby union international
Onslow Humphreys (born c.1893), Australian rugby union player
Parry Wayne Humphreys (1778–1839), U.S. politician
Paul Humphreys (born 1960), British musician
Percy Humphreys (1880–1959), English international footballer
Peter Humphreys, Papua New Guinea politician
Punter Humphreys (1881–1949), English cricketer
Reg Humphreys (1888–1967), English footballer
Richard Humphreys (disambiguation)
Ritchie Humphreys (born 1977), English footballer
Robert Humphreys (disambiguation)
Robin Humphreys (1907–1999), founder of Latin American studies in the United Kingdom
Russell Humphreys (born 1942), American creationist physicist
Sir Salusbury Pryce Humphreys (1778–1845), British naval officer
Samuel Humphreys (1778–1846), U.S. naval engineer
Sarah C. Humphreys, Classical scholar
Sarah Gibson Humphreys (1830–1907), American author, suffragist
Sheila Humphreys (1899–1994), Irish political activist
Thomas Humphreys (disambiguation)
Tog Humphreys (born 1968), English former cricketer
Walter Humphreys senior (1849–1924), English cricketer
Walter Humphreys junior (1878–1960), English cricketer
Warren Humphreys (born 1952), English professional golfer
West Hughes Humphreys (1806–1882), U.S. and Confederate Judge, prohibitionist
William Humphreys (disambiguation)

See also
Humfrey, given name and surname
Humphery, surname
Humphrey, given name and surname
Humphry, surname
Humphries, surname
Humphrys, surname

English-language surnames
Patronymic surnames
Surnames from given names